The High Command of the Military of Bolivia entrusted General Guido Vildoso Calderón with the Presidency on 21 July 1982, and he formed his cabinet.

mil – military

ind – independent

MNR – Revolutionary Nationalist Movement

FSB – Bolivian Socialist Falange

AND – Nationalist Democratic Action

Notes

Cabinets of Bolivia
Cabinets established in 1982
Cabinets disestablished in 1982
1982 establishments in Bolivia